Shandur Pass() is a pass located in Ghizer, District of Gilgit Baltistan . It is often called 'Roof of the World. 

 
During the annual 'Shandur Polo Festival,' polo matches take place between teams from Chitral District and Gilgit-Baltistan Province, at the Shandur Polo Ground on Shandur Top. Approximately seven matches are played in the three days of the festival, usually held July 7th to 9th every year.

Geography

History
In the early thirties, Britain's appointed political agent, Major Evelyn Hey Cobb (later Lieutenant Colonel) passed an order to Niat Qabool Hayat Kakakhel, Nambardar of Ghizer to establish a huge polo ground in Shandur. Kakakhel's polo ground was later named "Mas Junali": in Khowar language ‘mas’ means ‘moon’ and ‘junali’, ‘polo ground’. Cobb was very fond of playing polo by moonlight. 

Ali Sher Khan Anchan Maqpoun used to play polo at Shandoor when Chitral was part of the Maqpoun empire. Historically, polo was played between the small kingdoms, villages and rival groups of Gilgit Agency. From 1936 on, annual polo tournaments were held at Shandur under the patronage of the British. The three-day Shandur Polo Festival has developed steadily in recent years into the massive celebration of mountain polo that it is today.

British rulers were impressed by the unprecedented constructional works of the people of Koh-e-Ghizer and offered Niat Qabool Hayat a prize. Instead, he made it for a collective benefit and requested British representatives stock local water streams with trout. Soon after, a large amount of trout was provided to the streams of Koh-e-Ghizer. 

Many people from all over the world come to watch polo matches between Chitral and Ghizer At first it was a training game for cavalry or other elite units. To the warlike tribesmen who played polo with as many as 100 players to a side, it was a miniature battle. It became a Persian national game in the 6th century AD. From Persia, the game spread to Arabia, then to Tibet, China and Japan. In China, in the year 910, the  death of a favourite relative in a game prompted Emperor Apaochi to order the beheading of all players.

Ali Sher Khan Anchan  playef polo at Shandoor when be briefly occupied Chitral. The princes and political agents of Chitral also enjoyed playing polo in Shandur. From 1936 onwards polo tournaments were held annually at Shandur at the patronage of the British. The three-day Shandur Polo Festival has developed steadily in recent years into the massive celebration of mountain polo that it is today.
Since 1982 the matches are being arranged by Chitral administration , levies, Chitral scout and police.
GB teams participated as guests team .

See also 
 Shandur
 Golaghmuli Valley
 Gilgit River

References

https://www.chitraltoday.net/2019/05/31/know-some-basics-about-shandur-festival/

Books 
The Gilgit Game by John Keay (1985) 
The Kafirs of the Hindukush (1896) Sir George Scott Robertson.
To the Frontier (1984) Geoffrey Moorehouse, pp. 267–270. Hodder and Stoughton Ltd., Great Britain. Reprint: Sceptre edition 1988. 
Shandur, Durand's Boundary Line Violation (2014) by Rai Sarfaraz Shah, Ex-MNA LC Gilgit-Baltistan

External links
https://web.archive.org/web/20180125163406/http://www.visitgilgitbaltistan.gov.pk/
https://web.archive.org/web/20100831072645/http://gilgitbaltistan.gov.pk/
http://www.shandur.chitralstudio.com/history/

Camping in Pakistan
Polo in Pakistan
Plateaus of Pakistan
Reservoirs in Pakistan
Lakes of Gilgit-Baltistan
Hindu Raj

Geography 
Shandur Pass, which is considered one of the most serene areas of Pakistan, is at an elevation of around 12,500 feet. It connects these two regions of Pakistan via a road. It is 212 km away from Gilgit.

History
In 1936, the Political Agent of the region, Colonel Evelyn Hey Cobb (later Lieutenant Colonel) passed an order to Khwaja Mir Aman Shah Asaqal and Niat Qabool Hayat Kakakhel, Nambardar of Chitral to establish a huge polo ground in Shandur. Kakakhail soon implemented the orders of higher headquarters on the ground and with the help of his manpower, he established a polo ground at Shandur. The polo ground was later on named "Mas Junali", as in Khowar language ‘mas’ is word for ‘moon’ and ‘junali’ is word for ‘polo ground’. Cobb was very fond of playing polo in the moonlight.Ali Sher Khan Anchan Maqpoun used to play polo at Shandoor when Chitral was briefly occupied by him. The Princes and political agents of Chitral also enjoyed playing Polo in Shandur. Historically, polo being the king of games was played between small kingdoms, villages and rival groups of Chitral and Gilgit. From 1936 onwards polo tournaments were held annually at Shandur at the patronage of the British. The three-day Shandur Polo Festival has developed steadily in recent years into the massive celebration of mountain polo that it is today.
Since 1982 the matches are being arranged by Chitral administration , levies, Chitral scout and police.
GB teams participated as guests team .

British rulers impressed by the unprecedented constructional works of the people of Koh-e-Ghizer and offered Niat Qabool Hayat for a prize. Instead, he made it for a collective benefit and requested British representatives to fill local water streams with live stocks of Trouts. Soon after, a large amount of trout was provided to the streams of Koh-e-Chitral.

Cultural events 
During the annual Shandur Polo Festival, there are polo matches played at the Shandur Polo Ground on Shandur Top, between the teams of Chitral District and Gilgit-Baltistan. Approximately seven matches are played in the three days of the festival usually held on 7th to 9th July every year. The final match is played on 9th July between Teams A of Gilgit-Baltistan and Chitral.

Mas Junali ( moonlighted polo ) became a source of relation between the people of Chitral District and Gupis-Yasin/Ghizer districts. Many of the people from entire world come here to watch polo match played between Chitral and Ghizer.

See also 
 Mastuj Valley
 Tirich Mir
 Chitral River

References

Books 
The Gilgit Game by John Keay (1985) 
The Kafirs of the Hindukush (1896) Sir George Scott Robertson.
To the Frontier (1984) Geoffrey Moorehouse, pp. 267–270. Hodder and Stoughton Ltd., Great Britain. Reprint: Sceptre edition 1988. 
Shandur, Durand's Boundary Line Violation (2014) by Rai Sarfaraz Shah, Ex-MNA LC Gilgit-Baltistan

External links
https://web.archive.org/web/20180125163406/http://www.visitgilgitbaltistan.gov.pk/
https://web.archive.org/web/20150924101238/http://www.shandur.chitralstudio.com/history/

Camping in Pakistan
Polo in Pakistan
Plateaus of Pakistan
Reservoirs in Pakistan
Lakes of Gilgit-Baltistan
Hindu Raj